Soul Outing! is an album by saxophonist Frank Foster recorded in 1966 and released on the Prestige label.

Reception

Allmusic awarded the album 3 stars with its review by Scott Yanow stating, "Foster plays in a variety of modern mainstream styles from the era including funk, Latin, a bit of gospel and more straight-ahead. The overall results are not that memorable but they do show Foster growing beyond the world of Count Basie".

Track listing 
All compositions by Frank Foster except as indicated
 "Show the Good Side" - 5:50    
 "While the City Sleeps" (Lee Adams, Charles Strouse) - 4:20    
 "Skankaroony" - 7:53    
 "Chiquito Loco" - 8:50    
 "Night Song" (Adams, Strouse) - 8:45  
Redcorded at Van Gelder Studio in Englewood Cliffs, New Jersey on June 27 (tracks 1 & 5) and July 11 (tracks 2-4), 1966

Personnel 
Frank Foster - tenor saxophone
Virgil Jones - trumpet
Pat Rebillot - piano
Billy Butler - guitar (1, 5)
Bob Cunningham (2-4), Richard Davis (1, 5) - bass
Alan Dawson - drums

References 

Frank Foster (musician) albums
1966 albums
Prestige Records albums
Albums produced by Cal Lampley
Albums recorded at Van Gelder Studio